The 37th Mandala is a horror novel written by Marc Laidlaw and published in 1996.  It tells the story of New Age writer Derek Crowe who uses an ancient mystical text as the basis of one of his works.  As his writing gains popularity, it also attracts the unwanted attention of the 37 mandalas—terrible Lovecraftian-style monsters—that the original text was about.

The 37th Mandala earned Laidlaw the 1996 International Horror Guild Award for "Best Novel". It was also nominated for World Fantasy Award for Best Novel in 1997.

In popular culture 
In the Valve computer game Half-Life, which Laidlaw helped design, this book is one of two seen on a shelf in the personal locker of Gordon Freeman. The other book on the shelf is The Orchid Eater, also by Laidlaw. In addition, another locker in the room is marked with the name "Laidlaw". Harry S Robins, known for voicing Dr Kleiner in Half-Life series, worked with Laidlaw on illustrations.

References

1996 American novels
American horror novels
1990s horror novels
Novels about writers